Murder in Grub Street is the second historical mystery novel about Sir John Fielding by Bruce Alexander.

Plot summary
A printer and his household are horrifically slaughtered, and a mad poet is caught red-handed at the scene.  But Sir John doubts that the real culprit has been found. 

1995 American novels
Sir John Fielding series
G. P. Putnam's Sons books